is a Japanese voice actress who was born in Tokyo, Japan. She is affiliated with the entertainment office Three Tree.

Filmography

Anime television series
 Aishiteruze Baby – Miki Sakashita
 AM Driver – Ivan Nyrguise (young)
 Aquarian Age: Sign for Evolution – Lemon
 Boogiepop Phantom – Arisa Nishi
 Buzzer Beater – Lenny
 Dance in the Vampire Bund – Yuzuru
 Eyeshield 21 – Torakichi
 Ginga Legend Weed – Teru
 InuYasha – Kaede (young)
 InuYasha: The Final Act – Kaede (young)
 Kenkō Zenrakei Suieibu Umishō – Tomoko Naruko
 Kino's Journey – Girl A (ep 3)
 K-On! – Satoshi Tainaka
 K-On!! – Satoshi Tainaka
 Mushishi – Saki, Taku (young)
 Noir – Rosalie
 Over Drive – Takeshi Yamato (young)
 Overman King Gainer – Afar
 School Rumble – Haruki Hanai (young)
 Sora o Miageru Shōjo no Hitomi ni Utsuru Sekai – Munto (young)
 Sugar Sugar Rune – Karen Manabe, Tarō Moriyama
 Witchblade – Naomi
 Yu-Gi-Oh! 5D's – Rally Dawson

Original video animation
 FLCL – Eri Ninamori

Video games
 Yu-Gi-Oh! 5D's: Tag Force 4 – Rally Dawson

Dubbing
 The Following – Joey Matthews (Kyle Catlett)

References

External links
 Mika Itō official site 
 

1984 births
Japanese child actresses
Japanese voice actresses
Living people
People from Tokyo